This is a list of Israeli football transfers in the 2012 summer transfer window by each club.

Israeli Premier league

Beitar Jerusalem

In:

Out:

Bnei Sakhnin

In:

Out:

Bnei Yehuda Tel Aviv

In:

Out:

F.C. Ashdod

In:

Out:

Hapoel Acre

In:

Out:

Ironi Kiryat Shmona

In:

Out:

Ironi Nir Ramat HaSharon

In:

Out:

Hapoel Be'er Sheva

In:

Out:

Hapoel Haifa

In:

Out:

Hapoel Ramat Gan

In:

Out:

Hapoel Tel Aviv

In:

Out:

Maccabi Haifa

In:

Out:

Maccabi Netanya

In:

Out:

Maccabi Tel Aviv

In:

Out:

References 

Israel
Transfers
2012